Camille Nicou (born 5 September 1894, date of death unknown) was a French racing cyclist. He rode in the 1923 Tour de France.

References

1894 births
Year of death missing
French male cyclists
Place of birth missing